St. James's Bridge in Ljubljana is a bridge that crosses the Ljubljanica River on the southern end of downtown Ljubljana, next to Zois Manor. It links Zois Street and Karlovac Street. The most important city traffic artery across the Ljubljanica runs across it.

Background
A wooden bridge was constructed at this place in 1824, later than other bridges of the period, and for a long time it was therefore called the New Bridge. In 1915, it was replaced by a reinforced concrete corbel bridge by the engineer Alois Král and the architect Alfred Keller. It was described by the art historian Damjan Prelovšek as a "monumental neo-Biedermeier architectural language of late-Secession Vienna."

Since 1954, there has been a plaque with an inscription on the bridge about a 15th-century town watermill, which caused damage to farmers and was destroyed in the 1515 peasant revolt. Four bronze relief plaques depicting scenes from The Water Man, a Ljubljana-related Romantic ballad by the poet France Prešeren, were intended to be put on the fence of the bridge. However, this has been never realised.

References

External links

Bridges in Ljubljana
Bridges over the Ljubljanica
Road bridges in Slovenia
Center District, Ljubljana
Bridges completed in 1915
20th-century architecture in Slovenia